The Bachelor Canada is a Canadian reality television series that first premiered on October 3, 2012, and is based on the American television series The Bachelor. Seasons 1 and 2 aired on the City television network, after which point the franchise was picked up by W Network, for its third season.

Production
In 2012 it was first announced that The Bachelor was coming to Canada. The show is produced by Good Human Productions. Filming began in Spring 2012.

The Host
Originally hosted by Tyler Harcott for the first two seasons, the show is now helmed by Canadian actor and host Noah Cappe.

Season 1 Bachelor
Brad Smith was born on October 2, 1983 in Hudson, Quebec. His father is Larry Smith, a Canadian Senator, former CFL Commissioner, and former President and CEO of the Montreal Alouettes, and his mother is Leesa Smith. He received a scholarship at St. Andrew's College, and later advanced to Queen's University. During his football career, Brad had several seasons with a variety of teams: Montreal Alouettes, Toronto Argonauts, and the Edmonton Eskimos. Living as a professional athlete, Brad adjusted to living an upbeat and on-the-go lifestyle; however, this meant that he never had the opportunity to seek "true love." This feeling led him to audition for The Bachelor Canada, where he had high hopes of finding love and starting a family.

Season 2 Bachelor
Born and raised in the small town of Campbellville, Ontario, Tim Warmels attended business school at the University of Western Ontario before moving to Toronto and becoming an investment banker on Bay Street. He now has a number of tech ventures, and enjoys travelling, modeling and building custom furniture in his spare time.

Meet the Family crossover 
In a crossover episode Tim Warmels appeared as himself in the Citytv hidden camera comedy series Meet the Family. In the storyline, the boyfriend (prank victim) was told by his real girlfriend's fake mother that she was having an affair. When Warmels showed up at the door holding roses, the boyfriend did not recognize him, said he'd never watch the show and tried to force him out of the house.

Season 3 Bachelor
Born in Montreal, Quebec, Chris Leroux moved to Mississauga, Ontario with his parents and brother when he was three years old. He grew up with strong family values and an ingrained passion for sports. Chris’ dad introduced him to baseball when he was young, and with his family’s encouragement and support, he set his sights on the big leagues. With a lot of hard work and perseverance, Chris fulfilled his dream, playing for the New York Yankees, Florida Marlins and Pittsburgh Pirates during his incredible professional career.  A laid back guy with diverse interests that range from surfing to vintage cars to playing the piano, Chris is always ready to try something new.

Seasons

Broadcast
Internationally, the series premiered in Australia on 10 November 2015 on LifeStyle You.

References

2010s Canadian reality television series
2012 Canadian television series debuts
English-language television shows
Canada
Canadian television series based on American television series
Canadian dating and relationship reality television series
W Network original programming
Citytv original programming